Olga Glouschenko (born 25 January 1978) is a Belarusian former professional tennis player.

Playing for Belarus at the Fed Cup, Glouschenko has a win–loss record of 1–0.

ITF Circuit finals

Singles: 1 (0–1)

Doubles: 6 (2–4)

Fed Cup participation

Doubles

References

External links
 
 
 

1978 births
Living people
Belarusian female tennis players
Tennis players from Minsk
20th-century Belarusian women